On the Air were an English rock band formed in the late 1970s, and were based in the Ealing area of West London. It included Simon Townshend, Mark Brzezicki and Tony Butler.

They released their first single "Ready for Action" in 1980.

Discography

Singles
1980: "Ready for Action"
1980: "Another Planet"

References

English new wave musical groups
English power pop groups